Huge is a 2010 British comedy film. It is Ben Miller's debut as a director and an adaptation of a stage play written by Miller, Jez Butterworth and Simon Godley.

Production
The play Huge was a hit at Edinburgh Festival Fringe and it took Miller fifteen years to get the film adaptation made. While the play was co-written with Jez Butterworth and Simon Godley, Butterworth was committed to working on Fair Game and was unable to take part in writing the film adaptation.

Thandiwe Newton's role was written for her but she had reservations so Miller worked with script editor Jay Basu to rewrite and incorporate Newton's suggestions.

Cast
 Noel Clarke - Clark
 Johnny Harris - Warren Duggan
 Ralph Brown - Neil
 Thandiwe Newton - Kris
 Tamsin Egerton - Clarisse
 Russell Tovey - Carl

Reception
The film was poorly received with a 14% rating at Rotten Tomatoes.
Time Out gave the film one star and called the film "half-formed." The Guardian agreed calling the film "quite a finished product" but called it "an affectionate and promising debut" for filmmaker Miller. Empire gave the film two stars and called it "fatally unfunny."

References

External links 
 
 

2010 films
2010 comedy films
British comedy films
Films set in London
2010s English-language films
2010s British films